Jorge Rodrigo Araújo Messias (born 25 February 1980) is a Brazilian attorney, incumbent Attorney General of Brazil nominated by president Luiz Inácio Lula da Silva. He is a prosecutor of National Finances since 2007 and served as sub-chief for juridical affairs of the Chief of Staff during the presidency of Dilma Rousseff.

Messias also worked as prosecutor in the Central Bank of Brazil and the Brazilian Development Bank (BNDES), juridical consultant in the Ministry of Science, Technology and Innovation, secretary of regulation and oversight of Higher Education in the Ministry of Education, sub-chief of government political analysis and follow-up in the Chief of Staff and parliamentary assistant of senator Jaques Wagner.

Messias is Bachelor of Laws at the Federal University of Pernambuco (UFPE) and Master of Development, Society and International Cooperation at University of Brasília (UnB).

In November 2022, Messias was the most voted by his peers in a sixfold list for the office of Attorney General of the Union, made by the National Union of National Finances Prosecutors (Sinprofaz), the National Association of Members of the Attorney General of the Union (Anajur) and the National Association of the Attorneys of the Union (Anauni).

References

|-

1980 births
Living people
Federal University of Pernambuco alumni
University of Brasília alumni
Attorneys General of Brazil